Mohammad Yunus Khan (26 June 1916 – 17 June 2001) was a member of Indian Foreign Service. He served as ambassador to Turkey, Indonesia, Iraq, and Spain. He promoted trade between India and the rest of the world through regular trade fairs and the establishment of exhibition complex at Pragati Maidan in Delhi. He also headed erstwhile Trade Fair Authority of India (TFAI) which is now rebranded as India Trade Promotion Organization. The Government of India awarded him the civilian honour of the Padma Bhushan.

Personal details
Yunus was born on 26 June 1916 in the city of Abbottabad, North-West Frontier Province, to Haji Ghulam Samdani and Murvari Jan. His maternal uncle was Khan Abdul Gaffar Khan and he studied at Muslim University School, Aligarh and Islamia College, Peshawar.

He died at the age of 84 on 17 June 2001 at the AIIMS, New Delhi after a protracted illness, surrounded by family and friends.

Independence movement
Yunus was a follower of Khan Abdul Ghaffar Khan, with whom he worked from 1936 to August, 1947 as a Khudai Khidmatgar. He was imprisoned during the Quit India Movement by Iskandar Mirza in 1941. In Abbottabad Prison he contracted tuberculosis and was subsequently released in 1944, as the government did not think he would survive. After recuperating, he was again jailed in Kashmir in 1946.

Career
He joined the Indian Foreign Service in 1947 after he was appointed by the then Prime Minister, Jawaharlal Nehru, de hors the processes of public examination commenced in 1948. . During his time with the IFS, he represented India at the Non-Aligned Summits at Lusaka, Algiers, Colombo, New Delhi, and Harare.

Yunus retired as Secretary to the Ministry of Commerce in 1974.

In 1975 he was appointed as special envoy of the then Prime Minister Indira Gandhi. In this capacity he established the Pragati Maidan in Delhi and went on regular trade exhibitions around the globe to promote Indian products and companies.

He was nominated to the Rajya Sabha in June 1989.

Emergency period
During the Emergency of 1975–77, Yunus was in the inner circle of Indira Gandhi and served as one of her most trusted advisers.

Adil Shahryar
Yunus's son Adil Shahryar was a childhood friend of Rajiv Gandhi and his brother Sanjay Gandhi. It is alleged that Rajiv Gandhi secured his release through a Presidential pardon from Ronald Reagan from a US prison in the aftermath of the Bhopal Disaster as a quid pro quo for releasing Warren Anderson from Indian custody at the time. Adil Shahryar was in Jail in the US for hotel arson and terrorist charges.

Except for the time his name was allegedly involved in the Fairfax Affair during the VP Singh regime regarding an alleged bribe to an American investigation agency to keep Rajeev Gandhi's name out of its findings from IRS investigations of graft, Adil Shahryar lived a quiet life thereafter and died in 1990.

Literary works
The first book written by Yunus was titled Frontier Speakers , with a foreword by Jawaharlal Nehru and a preface by Khan Abdul Ghaffar Khan. It was banned by the British government in 1942. He then wrote "Kaidi ke Khat", in Urdu, later translated into English and Hindi, and finally his memoirs, Persons, Passions and Politics published in November 1979.

See also
 Aligarh Muslim University
 Syed Akbaruddin

References

External links
http://twocircles.net/2011jun19/mohammed_yunus_19162001_migrant_pakistan.html
http://www.outlookindia.com/article.aspx?211281
http://indiatoday.intoday.in/story/rajiv-gandhi-charmed-yasser-arafat-ayatollah-ali-khamenei/1/160805.html
http://www.krnarayanan.in/html/speeches/others/award_20aug1995.htm

Indian Muslims
People from Aligarh
Indian people of Pashtun descent
Ambassadors of India to Turkey
Ambassadors of India to Indonesia
Ambassadors of India to Iraq
Ambassadors of India to Spain
Academic staff of Islamia College University
1916 births
2001 deaths
Nominated members of the Rajya Sabha
Recipients of the Padma Bhushan in civil service
People from Abbottabad